Flight 217 may refer to:

Aero Flight 217, crashed on 8 November 1963
Pan Am Flight 217, crashed on 12 December 1968.
Aeroflot Flight 217, crashed on 13 October 1972
Aeropesca Colombia Flight 217, crashed on 26 March 1982
Azerbaijan Airlines Flight 217, crashed on 23 December 2005

See also

 
 Flight (disambiguation)
 217 (disambiguation)

0217